Jordan Valley Ice Park is a multi-purpose arena located in downtown Springfield, Missouri. The arena is owned and operated by the Springfield-Greene County Park Board and serves as a location for community recreation and the home for the Missouri State Ice Bears ice hockey team, and various youth sports programs. The arena opened in 2001 as Jordan Valley Ice Park. In 2008, it was renamed to Mediacom Ice Park, due to a $200,000 a year, 10-year naming rights agreement with Mediacom, a cable television and communications provider in the United States. This agreement expired in 2019, whereupon the arena reverted to its original name.

References

External links

Indoor arenas in Missouri
Sports venues in Missouri
Indoor ice hockey venues in Missouri
Sports venues in Springfield, Missouri
2001 establishments in Missouri
Sports venues completed in 2001
College ice hockey venues in the United States